Hendrik Reiher (born 25 January 1962 in Eisenhüttenstadt) is a German rowing cox. He competed for the SG Dynamo Potsdam / Sportvereinigung (SV) Dynamo. He won medals at several Summer Olympics as well as at international rowing competitions. He competed for East Germany until 1990, and from the 1991 rowing season for Germany after the German reunification.

References

External links
 
 

1962 births
Living people
Sportspeople from Eisenhüttenstadt
People from Bezirk Frankfurt
German male rowers
East German male rowers
Coxswains (rowing)
Olympic rowers of Germany
Rowers at the 1988 Summer Olympics
Rowers at the 1992 Summer Olympics
Olympic gold medalists for East Germany
Olympic silver medalists for Germany
Olympic medalists in rowing
World Rowing Championships medalists for East Germany
Medalists at the 1992 Summer Olympics
Medalists at the 1988 Summer Olympics
Recipients of the Patriotic Order of Merit in gold
Recipients of the Silver Laurel Leaf